The South African Maritime Safety Authority (SAMSA) is a South African government agency established on 1 April 1998 as a result of the 1998 South African Maritime Safety Authority Act 5. as such it is responsible for the implementation of current International & National Regulations regarding the Maritime Industry as well as upon all recreational marine vessels within its jurisdiction.

SAMSA via the administration and/or management of all things marine related is in effect the governing authority and as such is required to investigate maritime accidents/incidents & to provide various marine related services both on behalf of Government as well as to Government.

Overview of services 

To & on behalf of Government:
 Advise Government on maritime issues relating to or affecting South Africa
 Administer current legislation & policies, submit additional proposals thereon as & when required so as to flag State Implementation
 Represent South Africa at international forums, liaise with foreign governments & other International institutions on behalf of South African Government
 On behalf of the Minister of Transport liaise with other South African institutions & various State Departments 
 Administration of government maritime contracts
 Provide a maritime Search and Rescue (SAR) capability within the South African area of responsibility - via the management (on behalf of DOT) of the Maritime Rescue Coordination Centre (MRCC)
 Conduct Accident investigations and provide Emergency Casualty Response
 Control of State Ports, including management of the DOT contracted pollution prevention and response capability
      
To Maritime Industry (local & International):    
 Conduct Statutory surveys and issue Safety certification of vessels
 Certification of Seafarers
 Provide Assistance and advice on maritime legislation
 Provide advice & grant approval in construction and refitting of vessels, including the evaluation & approval of fittings & equipment used.
 Consultancy to industry on technical matters, safety and qualifications

To Stakeholders:
 Safety equipment approval
 Port State Control Inspections
 Inspections of ships and cargoes of timber, grain and hazardous goods
 Accreditation of maritime training institutions and maritime training programmes
 Monitoring of South African seafarers’ welfare and conditions of service
 Provision of maritime safety information to shipping & ensuring a reliable radio service
 Ensuring that navigational aids are in place around the South African coastline
 Assimilation and maintenance of shipping information and statistics

It is subordinate to the Minister of Transport, who heads the Department of Transport. Despite it being a marine authority its head office is over 500 km away from the nearest ocean in Pretoria.

SAMSA administers the South African ship register.
 
In July 2012 the authority acquired the former Antarctic supply vessel S. A. Agulhas as a training ship.

References

External links

 South African Maritime Safety Authority

Government agencies of South Africa
Maritime safety organizations
1998 establishments in South Africa
Government agencies established in 1998
Ship classification societies